Wickford may refer to:

Wickford, Essex
Wickford railway station in Wickford, Essex
Rayleigh and Wickford (UK Parliament constituency)
Wickford, Rhode Island, USA
Wickford Junction MBTA station in Wickford, Rhode Island.